The Battle of Cap de la Roque was a naval battle that took place on 22 May 1703 between a Dutch convoy protected by captain Roemer Vlack and a French squadron under Alain Emmanuel de Coëtlogon, during the War of the Spanish Succession.

During this war the French and Spanish fleet could not face the English and Dutch in an open sea battle and therefore had switched to privateering. The allies were thus forced to protect their merchant convoys.

On May 21, 1703 a large merchant fleet consisting of about 110 English and Dutch ships transporting mainly salt, but also wine and sugar, left Lisbon for England. There were five escorting Dutch ships: the ships of the line Muiderberg (50), Gaesterland (46) and Schermer (44) and the frigates Rotterdam (34) and Rozendaal (36), under the command of Captain Roemer Vlacq on board the Muiderberg.

The next day near Cabo da Roca (fr: Cap de la Roque) they encountered the squadron of Coëtlogon composed of five larger warships : Vainqueur (84), Monarque (90), Éole (64), Orgueilleux (90) and Couronne (76).

Vlacq, after signalling the merchantmen to save themselves, lined up his ships to protect the fleet and engaged the French. The Dutch fought valiantly but the French were too strong and ship after ship had to capitulate.

Vlack and the Muiderberg fought on until half of the crew was dead or wounded. Vlack lost an arm and part of his shoulder, but he only surrendered when the main mast came down and the ship was on the point of sinking. The survivors were evacuated and what was left of the Muiderberg was burnt and sank.

Thanks to the sacrifice of Vlacq, the convoy got away intact, meaning this Dutch defeat had little impact on the cause of the Grand Alliance.

Vlacq, his men and the four surviving Dutch warships were taken as prizes to Toulon, were Vlacq died of his wounds on July 17, 1703. The Dutch ships were added into the French Navy.

Alternative name 
This battle is sometimes called "The Battle of the Bay of Biscay", but this is geographical not correct, as Cabo da Roca is situated in the southern part of Portugal.

External links 
  Zeegevecht in de Golf van Biskaje (Dutch)

Battle of Cap de la Roque
Naval battles of the War of the Spanish Succession
Naval battles involving the Dutch Republic
Naval battles involving France
1703 in Europe